Do Not Disturb (previously known as The Inn) is an American sitcom, which premiered as a Fall entry on Fox's primetime lineup on September 10, 2008. The multi-camera series was co-produced through Reveille Productions, Principato-Young Entertainment, and 20th Century Fox Television. On September 24, 2008, Fox cancelled the series, and the series ended on October 8, 2008, with the remaining two episodes left unaired.

Synopsis
Do Not Disturb focuses on the going-ons at a once-popular New York City hotel as seen through the eyes of its employees. Fox ordered 13 episodes, with Jason Bateman directing the pilot.

After three episodes aired, the show was rumored to be cancelled on September 23, 2008. Fox officially cancelled the sitcom the following day, making it the first cancellation of the 2008–09 season.

Cast
 Niecy Nash as Rhonda Peet
 Jerry O'Connell as Neal Danner
 Molly Stanton as Nicole
 Jesse Tyler Ferguson as Larry
 Jolene Purdy as Molly Poleski
 Dave Franco as Gus

Episodes

U.S. Nielsen ratings

References

External links
 
From TV Fodder (March 2008)
Fox makes room for 'The Inn''' from Variety'' (March 18, 2008)
FOX Confirms Cancellation of DND
TVWeek: NBC, Take Heed

2008 American television series debuts
2008 American television series endings
2000s American workplace comedy television series
2000s American sitcoms
English-language television shows
Fox Broadcasting Company original programming
Television series by Reveille Productions
Television series by 20th Century Fox Television
Television shows set in New York City
Television series set in hotels